The Liberal Democratic Party of Afghanistan is a minor political party in Afghanistan. It was founded in 2001/02 by Afghan exiles living in Germany. The party identifies as pragmatic and centrist in ideology, with some social liberal features. The party states it wishes to avoid extremism and defend human rights and equality for all citizens of Afghanistan. It supports many classical ideas of liberal democracy and is relatively secular.

External links
Official website of the Liberal Democratic Party of Afghanistan

Political parties in Afghanistan
Secularism in Afghanistan
Liberalism in Afghanistan
Centrist parties
Liberal parties
Radical parties
Social liberal parties
Anti-clerical parties
Secularist organizations
Centrist parties in Asia